Beatrice Cenci is a 1926 Italian silent historical film directed by Baldassarre Negroni and starring Maria Jacobini, Raimondo Van Riel and Franz Sala. It is one of several films portraying the story of the sixteenth century Italian noblewoman Beatrice Cenci.

Cast
 Maria Jacobini as  Beatrice Cenci
 Raimondo Van Riel as Francesco Cenci
 Franz Sala as Marzio Savelli
 Gino Talamo as Olimpio Calvetti
 Ugo Gracci as il Catalano
 Cellio Bucchi as Amerigo Caponi
 Gemma De Sanctis as Lucrezia Petroni
 Camillo De Rossi as Marco Sciarra
 María De Valencia as Dianora Apolloni
 Lillian Lyl as  Bernardo Cenci
 Augusto Bandini
 Ida Marus
 Nino Beltrame
 Tranquillo Bianchi
 Felice Minotti

References

Bibliography
 Waters, Sandra. Narrating the Italian Historical Novel. ProQuest, 2009.

External links
 

1926 films
1920s historical drama films
1920s Italian-language films
Italian silent feature films
Italian historical drama films
Films directed by Baldassarre Negroni
Films set in the 16th century
Italian black-and-white films
Cultural depictions of Beatrice Cenci
1926 drama films
Silent historical drama films
1920s Italian films